Double O may refer to:

Double O (Cyrillic) , a letter of the Cyrillic script
Double O (charity), operated by Pete Townshend of The Who
Double-O, Michael Aguilar, American music producer
00 Agent, a fictional type of secret agent in the James Bond franchise